The Monument to Simion Murafa, Alexei Mateevici and Andrei Hodorogea was a monument in Central Chişinău, Moldova. It existed between 1933 and 1940.

Overview 

The monument was opened in 1933, in the park of the Nativity Cathedral in Central Chişinău. The monument was dedicated to Simeon G. Murafa, Alexei Mateevici, and Andrei Hodorogea. All of them died in August 1917.

In the evening of August 20, 1917 some 200 Russian soldiers, with Bolshevist leaders, seized and murdered two of the most conspicuous Moldavian leaders, Andrei Hodorogea and Simeon G. Murafa, in Chişinău itself.

On July 17, 1917 Alexei Mateevici wrote the poem Limba noastră, today the national anthem of the Republic of Moldova. A month later, on August 24, 1917, he died of epidemic typhus.

After the Soviet occupation of Bessarabia and Northern Bukovina, the monument was destroyed in 1940.

References

Bibliography  
 Eremia, Anatol (2001). Unitatea patrimoniului onomastic românesc. Toponimie. Antroponimie (ed. ediție jubiliară). Chișinău: Centrul Național de Terminologie, ed. „Iulian”. p. 62. .
 http://oldchisinau.com/kishinyov-starye-fotografii/pamyatniki-starye-fotografii/pamyatniki-kishinyova-do-1944-goda/?pid=1239 pic.21-26

External links
  Declaraţie privind restabilirea monumentului înălţat în grădina Catedralei în memoria eroilor naţionali: Simion Murafa, Alexei Mateevici şi Andrei Hodorogea

1933 sculptures
Monuments and memorials in Romania
Monuments and memorials in Chișinău
1933 in Romania
Demolished buildings and structures in Moldova